Is that a Monster, Alfie Atkins? is a 1978 children's book by Gunilla Bergström. Translated by Robert Swindells, it was published in English in 1988. As an episode of the animated TV series it originally aired over SVT on 5 January 1980 as "Odjuret och Alfons Åberg".

Plot
It's Saturday evening and Alfie has problems falling asleep. The recently passed day, Alfie and his friends were playing soccer with Alfie's new soccer ball. Alfie kicked the ball, which flew very far away. When a little guy acting as ball boy  couldn't find it, Alfie blamed the ball boy for stealing the ball and hit him. Alfie now thinks there's a monster under his bed. The upcoming week, Alfie tries to find the ball boy and ask him for forgiveness. The first days, he can't find it and Alfie continues to imagine there's a monster. Finally one day, as he watches the other friends playing soccer, he discovers the missing ball boy. The upcoming Saturday, they meet in the grocery store and Alfie ask for forgiveness. They become friends again, and Alfie's imaginary monster under the bed is gone.

References

1978 children's books
Association football books
Fiction about monsters
Rabén & Sjögren books
Works by Gunilla Bergström